Robyn Edna Lorraway (née Strong) (born 20 July 1961) was an Australian long jumper from Australia winning medals at the Commonwealth Games.

Biography
As Robyn Strong, she moved from Victoria to become an inaugural Australian Institute of Sport athletics scholarship holder. She was coached by Kelvin Giles. 
At the 1982 Commonwealth Games in Brisbane, she won the silver medal in the Women's Long Jump. After the Games, she married Ken Lorraway.  At the 1984 Olympic Games in Los Angeles, she finished sixth in the final on the Women's Long Jump. At the 1986 Commonwealth Games in Edinburgh, she won the bronze medal in the Women's Long Jump.   She won the Australian national Women's Long Jump title in 1983, 1984 and 1986. At the national titles, she came second in the Women's 100 m hurdles from 1979 to 1982.

Her husband Ken died suddenly in 2007. They had three children - two boys Alex and Sebastian and a daughter Madeline. Alex has followed in his father's footsteps as a triple jumper. In 1985, she was ACT Female Sportstar of the Year.

References

Commonwealth Games silver medallists for Australia
Commonwealth Games bronze medallists for Australia
Australian Institute of Sport track and field athletes
Athletes (track and field) at the 1982 Commonwealth Games
Athletes (track and field) at the 1986 Commonwealth Games
Athletes (track and field) at the 1984 Summer Olympics
Australian female long jumpers
Olympic athletes of Australia
Commonwealth Games medallists in athletics
Living people
1961 births
20th-century Australian women
21st-century Australian women
Medallists at the 1986 Commonwealth Games